Little Snaggy Mountain is a summit in the range of Allegheny Mountains in Garrett County, Maryland, in the United States, with an elevation of .

References

Allegheny Mountains